Chimbote) is the largest city in the Ancash Region of Peru, and the capital of both Santa Province and Chimbote District.

It is the start of a chain of important cities on the Peruvian north coast like Trujillo, Chiclayo and Piura. The advantages of this geographic location made Chimbote into a transshipment junction for the Santa River valley.

History
In 1835, when General Santa Cruz granted Chimbote's first official acknowledgement, Chimbote was a village of fishermen with a population of no more than 800.

In 1871, an agreement was made with Henry Meiggs to build a railroad towards the interior of the country. Chimbote was classified as a port, even though its population remained around 1,000. The opening of the Pan-American Highway created easy access to Lima in the 1930s. In 1881, there was an attempt to cede a naval base to the U.S. in Chimbote Bay by Peru. The deal was blocked by Chile who sent its marines to occupy Chimbote after learning of the deal to cede a naval base to the U.S. Navy.

In 1943, the government created the Corporación Peruana del Santa (Peruvian Corporation of Santa). This entity assumed ownership of the railroad, made improvements to the port, and began work on a hydroelectric power station on the Río Santa (in the Cañón del Pato [Duck Canyon] in Huallanca). The first stage of the power station was inaugurated in 1958; also that year, an iron and steel plant was built. By 1943, the first companies dedicated to the extraction of liver from the Pacific bonito fish arrived. This liver was sold for a high price abroad due to World War II.

Geography

Climate 
Chimbote's climate is comfortable, despite being located in the tropics and in a desert. Although classified as subtropical, Chimbote's proximity to the cool Humboldt current leads to temperatures much cooler than those expected for a tropical desert, and is classified as a desert climate. The annual average temperature is around 20 °C (68 °F).

The city gets little to no precipitation; however, thick fog predominates through the months of May to November, usually overnight. Rainfall usually comes in February.

Population

A large number of people migrated to Chimbote in the early 1970s. By that time, less than 5 percent of the people from Chimbote would truly consider themselves native; between 1960 and 1970, Chimbote's population multiplied by more than a hundred times. In 1900, the population of the port was 1,400; after 1970, it was 170,000. As of 2005, its population was 324,398.

The influx of residents was closely bound to the creation of the Corporación Peruana del Santa, to the start and development of the fishing industry, and to the establishment of the iron and steel plant ("Siderperu"). Together, these multiplied the commercial and productive activities of the port. At the beginning of 1996, as Peruvian public companies were privatized, the Peruvian-Brazilian company Acerco bought Siderperu.

Districts and neighborhoods
The city of Chimbote, being a district itself, comprises 7 more districts: Santa, Coishco, Samanco, Nepeña, Macate, Moro, Cáceres del Perú, and Nuevo Chimbote. The neighborhoods of El Barrio de Acero, Barrio Bolivar, El Progreso, Laderas del norte alto and laderas del norte bajo, Miraflores Alto and Miraflores Bajo surround Chimbote.

Economy

During the 1970s, the El Niño climate pattern, an earthquake, and overfishing drastically affected the fishing industry, and restrictions were imposed to ensure its survival. More than 75 percent of Peru's fishing industry is based in Chimbote.

Chimbote is the largest fishing port in the world. Chimbote has more than 30 fish factories. Chimbote's active commerce and its diversified industrial development are characteristic of the city. Its population includes workers who have experience in fishing, naval, canning, and the iron-and-steel industry with the company SIDERPERU.

Chimbote also has beaches that support tourism.

Peruvian anchoveta "boom"

Shortly after the fish canning industry declined, the industrialization of anchoveta fishing peaked. This attracted people from all over Peru, due to the high wages paid in the fishing industry at the time, fueling Chimbote's suburban growth. The strong migratory wave toward the city increased because of the serious crisis of the countryside in the 1960s, particularly in Ancash, Cajamarca and the northern part of La Libertad Region. The axis of development moved from the Pima cotton, sugarcane, and rice plantations to the large city. In addition, Chimbote was a natural exit channel for the exports of the Santa valley, and a starting point for the entry to the Callejón de Huaylas.

The Peruvian anchoveta boom created wealth in the city, but it soon ended due to indiscriminate fishing that overwhelmed the bio-mass. An earthquake in 1970 damaged to the facilities of the fishing industries, causing unemployment and impoverishment. During this period, the Diocese of Chimbote created the Social Welfare Commission, to organize diverse popular dining places in conjunction with UNICEF. Since the 1960s, the Roman Catholic Diocese of Pittsburgh has served the poor at the Chimbote Mission, raising funds through the Chimbote Foundation.

Tourism

Chimbote is surrounded by two natural bays, the Bay of Chimbote (or Ferrol) and the Bay of Samanco, both with excellent harbor conditions. Chimbote forms a conurbation with Nuevo Chimbote District to the south. Between these districts, the Humedales de Villa María, a swamp, is home to a local species of heron, along with many species of frogs and fish. The swamp is formed by the Lacramarca River.

To the south of the city, there are many beaches, such as Vesique, Los Chimús, Tortugas, Caleta Colorada and el Dorado. Also located near Chimbote is the Isla Blanca (white isle, in English), which takes its name from the white color of the ground.

Located next to the city is the Cerro de la Juventud (Mountain of Youth), also called Cerro de la Paz (Mountain of Peace). Since 1985, this tourist attraction attracts hundreds annually. Visitors appreciate a panoramic view of Chimbote's bay from the top of this mountain. Tourists can also visit Isla Blanca Boulevard, which has many beautiful marble sculptures and fountains.

From Chimbote, some short tourist circuits can be taken:
 Chimbote – Casma – Sechín – Yaután
 Chimbote – Nepeña – San Jacinto – Moro – Jimbe
 Chimbote – Santa – Huallanca

The city is known for its ceviche, a popular Peruvian dish whose ingredients include white fish, octopus, seashell, squid, crab, and red hot pepper.

Festivals
Chimbote has two important celebrations during the year: Holy Week and The Festivity of San Pedrito of Chimbote (also called Chimbote's Civic Anniversary).
Patronal feast of San Pedrito, this festival has its origins in the 16th century with the first fishermen who populated Chimbote coming from Huanchaco. It is held from 23 to 30 June in devotion to the patron saint of fishermen San Pedro. The central feast day is on 29 June, the image of the saint is taken out in procession and It is paraded through the bay by boat.

Education
The Academia Preuniversitaria "Perpetuo Socorro" and the Catholic University Los Angeles of Chimbote are located in Chimbote.

Transportation

The Chimbote-Huallanca rail line, built in 1922, serves as a railway for coal and iron mines on the interior and a railway for the river valley by transporting rice, cotton, sugarcane, and bananas.

Bus terminal

El Chimbador Bus Terminal is Chimbote's primary ground transportation facility. The bus terminal is located outside of the city. It has become a vital connection for the region's workers, travelers and visitors, serving nearly 6,000 passengers a day. Currently there are 30 bus carriers offering services for national and international travel.

Port
The port of Chimbote is considered by some one of the most beautiful and safest ports in the Peruvian coast. It extends , from Caleta Colorada Bay (Red Creek Bay) in the north, where the present marine facilities are located, to Anconcillo in the south.

Airport
The city is served by the Teniente FAP Jaime Montreuil Morales Airport, operated by CORPAC S.A. It was created in 1957 under the government of President Manuel Prado Ugarteche. There are regular flights to Lima by LC Busre.

Sister cities
  Asunción, Paraguay
  Buenos Aires, Argentina
  Belo Horizonte, Brazil
  Huancayo, Peru
  Yokohama, Japan
  Nantes, France
  Madrid, Spain
  Pensacola, United States
  San José, Costa Rica
  Seattle, United States
  Pittsburgh, United States

See also

Ancash Region
1970 Ancash earthquake

Notes

References

Populated places in the Ancash Region
Port cities in Peru
Cities in Peru